National Tertiary Route 404, or just Route 404 (or ) is a National Road Route of Costa Rica, located in the Cartago province.

Description
In Cartago province the route covers Paraíso canton (Paraíso, Santiago districts), Alvarado canton (Cervantes district).

References

Highways in Costa Rica